Lexington Independent School District is a public school district based in Lexington, Texas (USA).

Located in Lee County, very small portions of the district extend into Bastrop, Milam, and Williamson counties.

In 2009, the school district was rated "academically acceptable" by the Texas Education Agency.

The current Superintendent of the Lexington Independent School District is Dr. Tonya Knowlton, Ph.D.

A. P. Kleinschmidt, a former LISD superintendent, is the father of current State Representative Tim Kleinschmidt from District 17 (Lee, Bastrop, Caldwell, Gonzales, and Karnes counties). The younger Kleinschmidt is an attorney in Giddings.

Schools
Lexington High School (Grades 9–12)
Lexington Middle School(Grades 6–8)
Lexington Elementary School (Grades PK-5)

References

External links
Lexington ISD

School districts in Lee County, Texas
School districts in Bastrop County, Texas
School districts in Milam County, Texas
School districts in Williamson County, Texas